The Wellington Monument, or sometimes the Wellington Testimonial, is an obelisk located in the Phoenix Park, Dublin, Ireland.

The testimonial is situated at the southeast end of the Park, overlooking Kilmainham and the River Liffey.

History
The Wellington Testimonial was built to commemorate the victories of Arthur Wellesley, 1st Duke of Wellington. Wellington, the British politician and general, also known as the 'Iron Duke', was born in Ireland. Originally planned to be located in Merrion Square, it was built in the Phoenix Park after opposition from the square's residents.

The obelisk was designed by the architect Sir Robert Smirke and the foundation stone was laid in 1817. In 1820, the project ran out of construction funds and the structure remained unfinished until 18 June 1861 when it was opened to the public. There were also plans for a statue of Wellington on horseback, but a shortage of funds ruled that out.

Features
There are four bronze plaques cast from cannons captured at Waterloo – three of which have pictorial representations of his career while the fourth has an inscription. The plaques depict 'Civil and Religious Liberty' by John Hogan, 'Waterloo' by Thomas Farrell and the 'Indian Wars' by Joseph Robinson Kirk. The inscription reads:

Asia and Europe, saved by thee, proclaim
Invincible in war thy deathless name,
Now round thy brow the civic oak we twine
That every earthly glory may be thine.

Cultural references
The monument is referenced throughout James Joyce's Finnegans Wake.  The first page of the novel alludes to a giant whose head is at "Howth Castle and Environs" and whose toes are at "a knock out in the park (p. 3)"; John Bishop extends the analogy, interpreting this centrally located obelisk as the prone giant's male member.  A few pages later, the monument is the site of the fictional "Willingdone Museyroom" (p. 8).

Gallery

Footnotes

References

Buildings and structures in Dublin (city)
Obelisks in the Republic of Ireland
Monumental columns in the Republic of Ireland
Tourist attractions in Dublin (city)
Monuments to Arthur Wellesley, 1st Duke of Wellington
Phoenix Park